The 1999–2000 season was Iraklis' 18th straight season on the Greek first tier. Managing a lower league finish than the previous season, their biggest feat was reaching the domestic cup semi-final.

Players

Squad

|}

Players who left during the season

|}

Managers
Kiril Dojcinovski: 1 July 1998 – 13 October 1998
Mats Jingblad: 13 October 1998 – 30 June 1999

Alpha Ethniki

League table

Results summary

Results by round

UEFA Intertoto Cup

Second round

References
Weltfussball

Iraklis Thessaloniki F.C. seasons
Iraklis